Painters who reside(d) in the State of Maine, USA, on a full-time or seasonal basis, or whose work is otherwise noted for its association with the Maine landscape: 
 Bo Bartlett (born 1955)
 George Wesley Bellows (1882–1925)
 Frank Weston Benson (1862–1951)
 Carroll Thayer Berry (1886–1978)
 Harrison Bird Brown (1831–1915)
 Frederic E. Church (1826–1900)
 Charles Codman (1800–1842)
 Thomas Cole (1801–1848)
 Jay Hall Connaway (1893–1970)
 Thomas Cornell (1937–2012)
 Earl Cunningham (1893–1977)
 Thomas Doughty (1793–1856)
 Rackstraw Downes (born 1939)
 Stephen Etnier (1903–1984)
 John Fulton Folinsbee (1892–1872)
 Harold Garde (1923–2022)
 Marsden Hartley (1877–1943)
 Robert Henri (1865–1929)
 Winslow Homer (1836–1910)
 Edward Hopper (1882–1967)
 Jon Imber (1950–2014)
 Dahlov Ipcar (1917–2017)
 Alex Katz (born 1927)
 Rockwell Kent (1882–1971)
 Charles F. Kimball (1831–1903)
 Frances Kornbluth (1920–2014)
 Leon Kroll (1884–1974)
 Yasuo Kuniyoshi (1893–1953)
 Fitz Henry Lane (1804–1865)
 John Marin (1870–1953)
 Daniel Merriam (born 1963)
 Louise Nevelson (1900–1988)
 George Lorenzo Noyes (1863–1945)
 Waldo Peirce (1884–1970)
 Fairfield Porter (1907–1975)
 Maurice Prendergast (1861–1924)
 Edward Willis Redfield (1869–1965)
 Walter Elmer Schofield (1867–1944)
 Reuben Tam (1916–1991)
 William Thon (1906–2000)
 John Walker (born 1939)
 Neil Welliver (1929–2005)
 Charles H. Woodbury (1864–1940)
 Andrew Wyeth (1917–2009)
 Jamie Wyeth (born 1946)
 N.C. Wyeth (1882–1945)
 William Zorach (1887–1966)

References

Painters
Lists of painters
Painters
Lists of American artists
 Painters